The Netherlands competed at the 2016 Summer Olympics in Rio de Janeiro, from 5 to 21 August 2016. Since the nation's official debut in 1900, Dutch athletes had competed at every edition of the Summer Olympic Games in the modern era, with the exception of the sparsely attended 1904 Summer Olympics in St. Louis and 1956 Summer Olympics in Melbourne (except the equestrian events in Stockholm), which the Netherlands boycotted because of the Soviet invasion of Hungary.

Medalists

| width=78% align=left valign=top |

| width="22%" align="left" valign="top" |

Competitors

| width=78% align=left valign=top |
The following is the list of number of competitors participating in the Games. Note that reserves in cycling, equestrian, field hockey and handball are not counted as athletes as long as the athlete did not compete in the Games.

Archery

The Netherlands qualified three archers into the men's individual and team events after having secured a top eight finish in the team recurve event at the 2015 World Archery Championships in Copenhagen, Denmark.

Athletics

The Netherlands has qualified 32 athletes (11 men and 21 women) into the following athletics events.

Track & road events
Men

Women

Field events

Combined events – Men's decathlon

Combined events – Women's heptathlon

Badminton

The Netherlands qualified three badminton players for each of the following events into the Olympic tournament. Selena Piek, along with her partners Eefje Muskens and Jacco Arends, had claimed their Olympic spots each in the women's and mixed doubles, respectively, by virtue of their top 16 national finish in the BWF World Rankings as of 5 May 2016.

Boxing

The Netherlands entered three boxers to compete in each of the following weight classes into the Olympic boxing tournament for the first time since 1992. Peter Müllenberg was the first Dutch boxer being selected to the Olympic team with a semifinal victory at the 2016 European Qualification Tournament in Samsun, Turkey. Meanwhile, Nouchka Fontijn had claimed her Olympic spot with a quarterfinal victory in the women's middleweight division at the World Championships in Astana, Kazakhstan.

Enrico Lacruz secured an additional Olympic place on the Dutch roster with his quarterfinal triumph at the 2016 AIBA World Qualifying Tournament in Baku, Azerbaijan.

Cycling

Road
Dutch riders qualified for the following quota places in the men's and women's Olympic road race by virtue of their top 15 final national ranking in the 2015 UCI World Tour (for men) and top 22 in the UCI World Ranking (for women). The Dutch women's road cycling squad was named to the Olympic roster on May 17, 2016, and was preceded by the men's squad two weeks later.

Men

Women

Track
Following the completion of the 2016 UCI Track Cycling World Championships, Dutch riders have accumulated spots in both men's and women's team sprint, as well as both the men's and women's omnium. As a result of their place in the men's and women's team sprint, Netherlands has assured its right to enter two riders in both men's and women's sprint and men's and women's keirin.

Sprint

Team sprint

* Shanne Braspennincx is the first reserve for the women's team sprint. She lives outside the Olympic Village during the Games, while she is not a member of the Dutch Olympic Team.** Nils van 't Hoenderdaal is the first reserve for the men's team sprint.

Pursuit

Keirin

Omnium

Mountain biking
Dutch mountain bikers qualified for two men's quota places into the Olympic cross-country race, as a result of the nation's sixth-place finish in the UCI Olympic Ranking List of May 25, 2016. Rudi van Houts was the first mountain biker, who met the criteria set by the NOC*NSF being selected to the Dutch cycling squad by virtue of his top ten finish at the 2015 European Mountain Bike Championships in Chies d'Alpago, Italy

The Dutch NOC*NSF decided to refuse the second quota place, as they didn't have a second mountain biker who met the national criteria. As a result of this, Van Houts was the only Dutch mountain biker to compete at the Games.

Originally, Anne Terpstra finished in eleventh place at the 2016 European Mountain Bike Championships, which was not enough to qualify for Rio 2016, while she did not manage to have a top 10 finish at a European Championships or a World Championships during the qualification period. However, the UCI decided to disqualify the Russian mountain biker Ekateryna Anoshina, who finished in eighth place. After the disqualification, Terpstra finished in tenth place and was qualified for Rio 2016.

BMX
The Netherlands has received three men's and two women's quota spots for BMX at the Olympics as a result of the nation's second-place finish for men and third for women in the UCI Olympic Ranking List of May 30, 2016. The BMX cycling team was announced on 1 June 2016.

Diving

Dutch divers qualified for one individual spot at the Olympics through the 2015 FINA World Championships, signifying the nation's Olympic return to the sport for the first time since 1992.

Equestrian

The Netherlands became one of the first three nations to earn places at the Games, qualifying a complete team in dressage by winning the bronze medal in the team event at the 2014 FEI World Equestrian Games. The Dutch eventing team also qualified for Rio by winning the bronze medal at the same World  Games.

Dressage
The Dutch dressage team was named on noon of 17 July 2016, after two selection events: CDIO Rotterdam (23-26 June) and Dutch Championships (15-17 July).

Eventing

"#" indicates that the score of this rider does not count in the team competition, since only the best three results of a team are counted.

Jumping

"#" indicates that the score of this rider does not count in the team competition, since only the best three results of a team are counted.

"TO" indicates that Vrieling was disqualified from competing for a place in the individual final rounds. He was allowed to start in the second and third qualification round, however, to be able to set a score for the team competition. After another disqualification in the second qualification round, Vrieling withdrew.

(*) Gerco Schröder and his horse London  is the first reserve for the Dutch jumping squad. He resided outside the Olympic Village during the Games, as he was not a member of the Dutch Olympic Team.

Fencing

Following the completion of the Grand Prix finals, Netherlands has entered one fencer into the Olympic competition. 2012 Olympian Bas Verwijlen had claimed a spot in the men's épée, as one of the top two individual fencers from Europe outside the world's top eight qualified teams in the FIE Adjusted Official Rankings.

Field hockey

Summary

Men's tournament

The Netherlands men's field hockey team qualified for the Olympics by having achieved a top three finish at the 2014–15 Men's FIH Hockey World League Semifinals.

Team roster

Group play

Quarterfinal

Semifinal

Bronze medal match

Women's tournament

The Netherlands women's field hockey team qualified for the Olympics by having achieved a top three finish at the second stop of the 2014–15 Women's FIH Hockey World League Semifinals.

Team roster

Group play

Quarterfinal

Semifinal

Gold medal match

Golf 

Netherlands has entered one golfer into the Olympic tournament. Joost Luiten (world no. 65) qualified directly among the top 60 eligible players for their respective individual events based on the IGF World Rankings as of 11 July 2016. Christel Boeljon and Anne van Dam also managed to reach a top 60 finish in the same list, but they did not manage to reach a top 100 finish at the World Ranking, which was the criteria set by the NOC*NSF to be qualified.

Gymnastics

Artistic
Netherlands fielded a full squad of ten gymnasts (five men and five women). Men's team and women's team have qualified for the first time since 1928 and 1976 Olympics, respectively. The women's team qualified through a top eight finish at the 2015 World Artistic Gymnastics Championships in Glasgow. Meanwhile, the men's team had claimed one of the remaining four spots in the team all-around at the Olympic Test Event in Rio de Janeiro.

Men
Team

Individual finals

Women
Team

Individual finals

Handball

Summary

Women's tournament

The Netherlands women's handball team qualified for the Olympics by virtue of a top two finish at the first meet of the Olympic Qualification Tournament in Metz, France.

Team roster

Group play

Quarterfinal

Semifinal

Bronze medal match

Judo

The Netherlands has qualified a total of eleven judokas for each of the following weight classes at the Games. Six men and four women, led by two-time Olympic bronze medalist Henk Grol, were selected by virtue of their top 22 (men) and top 14 (women) finish at the IJF World Ranking List as of 30 May 2016. Meanwhile, Sanne Verhagen at women's lightweight (57 kg) earned a continental quota spot from the European region, as the highest-ranked Dutch judoka outside of direct qualifying position.

Men

Women

Rowing

The Netherlands has qualified a total of eight boats for each of the following rowing classes into the Olympic regatta. Majority of rowing crews had confirmed Olympic places for their boats at the 2015 FISA World Championships in Lac d'Aiguebelette, France, while the rowers competing in the women's lightweight double sculls and women's eight were further added to the Dutch roster as a result of their top two finish at the 2016 European & Final Qualification Regatta in Lucerne, Switzerland.

The full Dutch rowing squad for the Games was named on July 6, 2016.

Men

Women

Qualification Legend: FA=Final A (medal); FB=Final B (non-medal); FC=Final C (non-medal); FD=Final D (non-medal); FE=Final E (non-medal); FF=Final F (non-medal); SA/B=Semifinals A/B; SC/D=Semifinals C/D; SE/F=Semifinals E/F; QF=Quarterfinals; R=Repechage

Sailing

Dutch sailors have qualified one boat in each of the following classes through the 2014 ISAF Sailing World Championships, the individual fleet Worlds, and European qualifying regattas. Following the completion of the Princess Sofia Trophy, a total of nine sailors, highlighted by London 2012 windsurfing champion Dorian van Rijsselberghe, had been selected to the Dutch team for the Olympics. Meanwhile, 49erFX duo Annemiek Bekkering and Annette Duetz rounded out the selection to the nation's Olympic sailing team at the ISAF World Cup meet (April 26 to May 1) in Hyères, France.

Men

Women

Mixed

M = Medal race; EL = Eliminated – did not advance into the medal race

Swimming

A total of 17 swimmers (7 men and 10 women) were named to the Dutch roster for the Games on July 12, 2016, with sprinter Ranomi Kromowidjojo looking to defend her Olympic titles in both the women's 50 and 100 m freestyle.

Men

Women

Table tennis

Netherlands has fielded a team of three athletes into the table tennis competition at the Games. China-based player Li Jiao secured a spot in the women's singles after claiming her respective title at the 2015 European Games. Furthermore, Li Jie secured a spot in the women's singles by winning the repechage group final at the 2016 European Qualification Tournament in Halmstad, Sweden.

Britt Eerland was awarded the third spot to build the women's team for the Games by virtue of a top 10 national finish in the ITTF Olympic Rankings.

Taekwondo

Netherlands entered one athlete into the taekwondo competition at the Olympics. Reshmie Oogink secured a place in the women's heavyweight category (+67 kg) by virtue of her top two finish at the 2016 European Qualification Tournament in Istanbul, Turkey.

Tennis

The Netherlands has entered three tennis players into the Olympic tournament. After winning the Nürnberger Versicherungscup and reaching the semi final of the French Open, Kiki Bertens (world no. 27) qualified directly for the women's singles as one of the top 56 eligible players in the WTA World Rankings, while Robin Haase did so for the men's singles based on the ATP World Rankings as of June 6, 2016.

Triathlon

The Netherlands has entered one triathlete to compete at the Olympics. London 2012 Olympian Rachel Klamer was ranked among the top 40 eligible triathletes in the women's event based on the ITU Olympic Qualification List as of May 15, 2016.

Volleyball

Beach
Three Dutch beach volleyball teams (two men's pairs and one women's pair) qualified directly for the Olympics by virtue of their nation's top 15 placement in the FIVB Olympic Rankings as of June 13, 2016. Among the beach volleyball players featured four-time Olympian and London 2012 fourth-place finalist Reinder Nummerdor, along with his rookie partner Christiaan Varenhorst.

Meanwhile, Sophie van Gestel and Jantine van der Vlist secured an additional women's beach volleyball place for the Games with their gold medal triumph over Ukraine at the 2016 CEV Continental Cup in Stavanger, Norway.

Indoor

Women's tournament

The Netherlands women's volleyball team qualified for the Olympics by virtue of a top three national finish at the first meet of the World Olympic Qualifying Tournament in Tokyo, Japan, signifying the team's Olympic comeback for the first time since 1996.

Team roster

Group play

Quarterfinal

Semifinal

Bronze medal match

Wrestling

The Netherlands has qualified one wrestler for the women's freestyle 48 kg into the Olympic competition, as a result of her top six finish at the 2015 World Championships, signifying the nation's Olympic return to the sport for the first time since 2000.

Women's freestyle

See also
Netherlands at the 2016 Summer Paralympics

References

External links 
 

Olympics
Nations at the 2016 Summer Olympics
2016